Burning Pink, also known as Beyond Politics and formerly registered with the Electoral Commission as The Burning Pink Party, was a British political party with the stated goal of a political revolution by replacing the British government with citizens' assemblies in order to tackle the climate crisis and other political issues.

Inception
The party launched in June 2020 with a shoplifting stunt in which members of the party walked out of a Sainsbury's supermarket branch in Camden Town, London with shopping trolleys full of food without paying.

On 25 July 2020, a number of the party members occupied a road around Trafalgar Square in London, holding a banner saying “bring down the government.”

In August, several members of the party were arrested for dousing the party headquarters of the Conservatives, Labour, the Lib Dems and the Green Party in pink paint over their inaction to tackle the climate crisis.

Later that month, five members of the party including Roger Hallam were arrested at their homes for conspiracy to cause criminal damage. They were placed on remand until the end of a planned period of disruption by multiple environmental groups, including Extinction Rebellion. All five members went on immediate hunger strike in protest at their imprisonment.

In January 2021, the group demanded that local councils honour their climate emergency declaration to act on the ecological collapse and social breakdown, or they would begin a nationwide campaign of nonviolent civil disobedience. In their 12 demands, Burning Pink called upon local councils to declare open rebellion against the government. On February 15, local Burning Pink groups used pink paint to vandalise Norwich City Council and Norfolk County Council, Ipswich Borough Council, Bristol City Hall and Brighton Town Hall.

Party status and name
The party's constitution states "The Party will be registered in Great Britain (excluding Northern Ireland)."

The party's application for registration in the Electoral Commission's register of political parties, to register the name "The Burning Pink Party", to apply to "All of Great Britain", was approved on 7 October 2020.

Beyond Politics Ltd is a company registered at Companies House (no. 12659497), incorporated on 10 June 2020; the party's website says "Burning Pink is a name we trade under to represent Beyond Politics Party Ltd".

Elections contested

Valerie Brown stood as Burning Pink's candidate for the 2021 London mayoral election. Brown launched her campaign on 13 November 2020. Brown finished in 20th place out of 20 candidates, achieving 5,305 votes (0.2%). Rachel Lunnon stood as the party's candidate in the ward of Windmill Hill, Bristol, achieving 90 votes (0.9%). Sue Hagley and Jennifer McCarthy stood as the candidates for the wards of St Margaret's and Westgate respectively in the 2021 Ipswich Borough Council election.
Dave Baldwin stood for Oxfordshire County Council for the Hanborough and Minster Lovell Division, and Tina Smith stood for Suffolk County Council for the St Margaret's and Westgate Division.

References

External links

Political parties in the United Kingdom
Environmental organisations based in the United Kingdom
Environmental protests in the United Kingdom
Radical environmentalism
Climate change organizations
2020 establishments in the United Kingdom
Direct democracy parties
Direct action